Anne-Lise Steinbach (born 3 June 1935) is a Norwegian politician for the Labour Party. She was elected to the Norwegian Parliament from Nordland in 1973, and was re-elected on one occasion.

On the local level she was a member of Bø municipal council from 1987 to 1991. Outside politics she started her professional career in telephony. Later, in 1993, she graduated from the University of Tromsø.

References

1935 births
Living people
People from Bø, Nordland
Labour Party (Norway) politicians
Members of the Storting
Nordland politicians
University of Tromsø alumni
Women members of the Storting
20th-century Norwegian politicians
20th-century Norwegian women politicians